Remote monitoring and management (RMM) is the process of supervising and controlling IT systems (such as network devices, desktops, servers and mobile devices)  by means of locally installed agents that can be accessed by a management service provider. 

Functions include the ability to:
 install new or updated software remotely (including patches, updates and configuration changes)
 detect new devices and automatically install the RMM agent and configure the device
 observe the behavior of the managed device and software for performance and diagnostic tasks
 perform alerting and provide reports and dashboards
Traditionally this function has been done on site at a company but many MSPs are performing this function remotely using integrated SaaS platforms.

See also
 Network management
 Network monitoring
 Application service management
 Application performance management
 Managed services
 Information technology outsourcing

References

Remote administration software